Year 1230 (MCCXXX) was a common year starting on Tuesday (link will display the full calendar) of the Julian calendar.

Events 
 By place 

 Byzantine Empire 
 March 9 – Battle of Klokotnitsa: Byzantine forces under Theodore Komnenos (Doukas) invade Bulgaria, breaking the peace treaty with Tsar Ivan Asen II. Theodore gathers a large army, including western mercenaries. The two armies meet near the village of Klokotnitsa. Ivan applies clever tactics and manages to surround the Byzantines. They are completely defeated, only a small force under Theodore's brother Manuel Doukas manages to escape the battlefield. Theodore is taken prisoner and is blinded. In the aftermath, Ivan quickly extends its control over most of Theodore's domains in Thrace, Macedonia and Albania. The Latin Duchy of Philippopolis and the independent principality of Alexius Slav are also captured and annexed into Bulgaria.

 Europe 
 King Alfonso IX defeats Ibn Hud al-Yamani (known as Almogàver by the Christians). This success opens the road to Badajoz to the Leonese troops. The Portuguese king Sancho II continues his offensive southward and takes Beja, Juromenha, Serpa and Moura.
 August – Treaty of Ceprano: Emperor Frederick II returns from the Sixth Crusade and signs a peace agreement with Pope Gregory IX at Ceprano. He agrees not to violate any territories held by the Papal States. In return for Frederick's concessions in Sicily.
 Frederick II bestows on the Teutonic Order a special privilege for the conquest of Prussia, including Chełmno Land, with papal sovereignty. He allows the Teutonic Knights to forcibly convert the Prussians to Christianity.
 September 24 – Alfonso IXNR K. R M ILFAN 2 ILHAN 2000 03 25 dies after a 42-year reign and is succeeded by his son Ferdinand III. He receives the Kingdom of León, in return for compensation in cash and lands for his half-sisters Sancha and Dulce.
 Siege of Galway: Norman forces under Richard Mór de Burgh invade Connacht and desolate a large portion of the country. He besieges Galway, but is forced to retreat after a week-long inconclusive battle.

 England 
 April 30 – King Henry III embarks from Portsmouth with a large expeditionary force. On May 2, he arrives at Guernsey, and the next day the English army lands at Saint-Malo, where Peter I (or de Dreux), duke of Brittany, meets Henry to pays him homage. During the months, the English forces march through the County of Anjou, taking the castle of Mirebeau in late July.
 October 27 – Henry III signs a truce with King Louis IX (the Saint) and returns to Portsmouth. He leaves a small force under Peter I and Ranulf de Blondeville, to act against the French in Brittany and Normandy.

 Middle East 
 Battle of Yassıçemen: A Seljuk-Ayyubid coalition (some 40,000 men) defeats the Khwarazmians under Sultan Jalal al-Din Mangburni at Erzincan on the Upper-Euphrates.

 By topic 

 Literature 
 The Carmina Burana poetry and song collection is created (approximate date).

Births 
 Anna of Hohenstaufen, empress of Nicaea (d. 1307)
 Adelaide of Holland, Dutch countess and regent (d. 1284)
 Bentivenga da Bentivengi, Italian cardinal (d. 1289)
 Boniface VIII, pope of the Catholic Church (d. 1303)
 Edmund de Lacy, English nobleman and knight (d. 1258)
 Elisabeth of Brunswick, German queen consort (d. 1266)
 Gottfried Hagen, German cleric and writer (d. 1299)
 Guillaume de Beaujeu, French Grand Master (d. 1291)
 Guillaume Durand, French bishop and writer (d. 1296)
 Henry of Castile (the Senator), Spanish prince (d. 1303)
 Hermann of Buxhoeveden, German bishop (d. 1285)
 Hugh Aycelin, French cardinal and theologian (d. 1297)
 Hu Sanxing (or Shenzhi), Chinese historian (d. 1302)
 Jacobus de Voragine, Italian archbishop (d. 1298)
 Leonardo Patrasso, Italian cardinal-bishop (d. 1311)
 Margaret Sambiria, Danish queen consort (d. 1282) 
 Masuccio Primo, Italian architect and sculptor (d. 1306) 
 Maud de Lacy, Norman-Irish noblewoman (d. 1304)
 Odo (or Eudes), French nobleman and knight (d. 1266)
 Peter Quinel, English archdeacon and bishop (d. 1291)
 Squarcino Borri, Italian mercenary leader (d. 1277)
 Yaroslav III of Tver, Kievan Grand Prince (d. 1271)

Deaths 
 January 30 – Pelagio Galvani, Leonese cardinal (b. 1165)
 February 1 – Matsudono Motofusa, Japanese nobleman 
 May 2 – William de Braose, English nobleman and knight
 May 13 – Casimir I of Opole, Polish nobleman and knight
 July 12 – Margaret of Blois, French noblewoman (b. 1170)
 July 19 –Theobald le Botiller, Norman nobleman (b. 1200)
 July 25 – Rudolph van Coevorden, Dutch nobleman (b. 1192)
 July 28 – Leopold VI, German nobleman and knight (b. 1176)
 July 29 – Hōjō Tokiuji, Japanese nobleman and spy (b. 1203)
 August 24 – Geoffrey de Saye, English nobleman (b. 1155)
 September 9 – Siegfried II, archbishop of Mainz (b. 1165)
 September 24 – Alfonso IX, king of León and Galicia (b. 1171)
 October 25 – Gilbert de Clare, English nobleman (b. 1180)
 November 20 – Nicola de la Haye, English noblewoman
 November 24 – Matthew II, French nobleman and knight
 December 15 – Ottokar I of Bohemia, German nobleman
 December 23 – Berengaria of Navarre, queen of England
 Al-Dakhwar, Ayyubid physician and medical officer (b. 1170)
 Alfonso Téllez de Meneses (the Old), Spanish nobleman 
 Beatrice of Viennois, French noblewoman (b. 1160) 
 Demetrius of Montferrat, king of Thessalonica (b. 1205)
 Guérin de Montaigu, French nobleman and Grand Master
 Hugues IV de Châteauneuf, French nobleman (b. 1185)
 Ibn Hammad, Hammadid historian and writer (b. 1153)
 Robert de Gresle, English landowner and knight (b. 1174)
 Samuel ibn Tibbon, French rabbi, doctor and philosopher
 Urraca López de Haro, queen of León (approximate date)

References